Champlain is a township in eastern Ontario, Canada, in the United Counties of Prescott and Russell on the Ottawa River. It was formed on January 1, 1998, through the amalgamation of West Hawkesbury Township, Longueuil Township, Town of Vankleek Hill, and the Village of L'Orignal.

Communities
The township comprises the communities of Aberdeen, Cassburn, Green Lane, Happy Hollow, Henrys Corners, L'Ange-Gardien, L'Orignal, Pleasant Corners, Ritchance, Riviera Estate, Sandy Hill, Springhill, Vankleek Hill, Vankleek Hill Station, Village Lanthier, and St. Eugene.  The township administrative offices are located in Vankleek Hill.

Demographics 

See also
List of townships in Ontario
List of francophone communities in Ontario

References

External links
 

Lower-tier municipalities in Ontario
Municipalities in the United Counties of Prescott and Russell
Township municipalities in Ontario